Innerspace is a 1987 American science fiction comedy film directed by Joe Dante and produced by Michael Finnell. Steven Spielberg served as executive producer. It was inspired by the 1966 science fiction film Fantastic Voyage. It stars Dennis Quaid, Martin Short and Meg Ryan, with Robert Picardo and Kevin McCarthy, with music composed by Jerry Goldsmith. It earned $25.9 million in worldwide theatrical rentals and won an Oscar for Best Visual Effects, the only film directed by Dante to do so.

Summary
In San Francisco, down-on-his-luck U.S. Navy aviator Lt. Tuck Pendleton resigns his commission and volunteers for a secret miniaturization experiment. He is placed in a submersible pod and both are shrunk to microscopic size. They are transferred into a syringe to be injected into a rabbit, but the lab is attacked by a rival organization, led by scientist Dr. Margaret Canker, that plans to seize the experiment and steal the miniaturization technology.

Experiment supervisor Ozzie Wexler, knowing their intentions, escapes with the syringe. A chase ensues with one of Canker's henchmen, Mr. Igoe, which ends at a nearby shopping mall. After being shot, Ozzie injects Tuck and the pod into an unsuspecting Jack Putter, a hypochondriac Safeway grocery clerk, the first person he comes into contact with.

On regaining consciousness, Tuck is unaware of what has happened and believes he has been injected into the rabbit. After attempts to radio the lab are unsuccessful, he navigates the pod to the optic nerve and implants a camera so he is able to see what the "host" sees. Realizing he is inside a human, he makes contact by attaching another device to Jack's inner ear, enabling him to talk to Jack. He explains that the pod has only a few hours' supply of oxygen and needs his help in order to extract him by going back to the lab.

At the lab, the scientists explain to Tuck and Jack that the other group stole one of two computer chips that are vital to the process. Their mastermind is Victor Scrimshaw. His henchmen include Canker, Igoe, and "The Cowboy".

Jack contacts Tuck's estranged girlfriend, Lydia Maxwell, a reporter who has had dealings with The Cowboy. They learn that he plans to buy the computer chip from Scrimshaw. After locating and knocking him unconscious, Tuck uses the pod's equipment to control Jack's face muscles, altering his features so he looks like The Cowboy. Lydia and Jack, posing as The Cowboy, meet with Scrimshaw to steal the chip from him. However, as they are about to take possession of it, Jack's nervousness overrides the transformation of his face, exposing the scam. Igoe captures him and Lydia and takes them to their laboratory. While imprisoned, Jack and Lydia share a kiss, which, unknown to them, transfers Tuck into Lydia's body through their saliva. Once taken to the laboratory, the criminals shrink Igoe and inject him into Jack to locate Tuck, kill him, and obtain the other chip that is attached to the pod.

Once Igoe has been injected, Jack and Lydia escape, steal back the chip, and order everyone, including Scrimshaw and Canker, in the laboratory at gunpoint into the miniaturization device. However, not knowing how to operate it, they only manage to shrink everyone to half the original size. Tuck, now inside Lydia, finds a growing baby and realizes that she is pregnant with his child. By going to her eardrum and playing their song (Sam Cooke's "Cupid"), he is able to alert them what has happened. Jack and Lydia kiss again to transfer him back. They frantically drive back to the lab in order to enlarge him, not realizing that the shrunken Scrimshaw and Canker are hiding in the back seat. While they attempt to subdue Jack and Lydia, Igoe locates Tuck in Jack's esophagus and attacks him. Tuck disables Igoe's craft and the latter is killed after Tuck drops him into Jack's stomach.

Back at the lab, with only minutes of supplemental oxygen left in the pod, Jack follows Tuck's instructions to eject it from his lungs by making himself sneeze due to his hairspray allergy. Tuck and the pod are successfully enlarged, and he is reunited with Lydia and finally gets to meet Jack in person. At Tuck and Lydia's wedding, held at Wayfarers Chapel, Tuck is seen wearing the chips from the experiment as cufflinks. When they climb into the limousine, it is revealed that The Cowboy is the driver and the shrunken Scrimshaw and Canker are hiding inside a suitcase in the trunk. Now confident and in control of his life, Jack recognizes The Cowboy and jumps into Tuck's vintage 1967 Mustang, pursuing the limousine to rescue the newlyweds.

Cast

In addition, the film's director, Joe Dante, has an uncredited cameo as a Vectorscope employee, while Short's  SCTV cast mates Joe Flaherty and Andrea Martin have cameos as waiting room patients.

Production
The film began as an original script by Chip Proser, who called it "basically a rip off of Fantastic Voyage. My idea was that the big guy was up and moving around and could react to what was going on inside." The script was optioned by Peter Guber at Warner Bros. in 1984. Guber offered the script to Joe Dante who turned it down. Guber then had the script rewritten by Jeffrey Boam as a comedy. Boam says "The idea was kind of ridiculous, which was a person miniaturized and put into someone else's body. That's all I kept from the original script. They originally thought it might be Michael J. Fox inside Arnold Schwarzenegger's body. I actually kept turning it down, and they were persistent and kept coming back to me."

According to Dante, Boam "approached it ... from the concept of what would happen if we shrank Dean Martin down and injected him inside Jerry Lewis." Dante says that Steven Spielberg had become involved on the project as an executive producer and he may have been responsible for the comedy. "It was such a goofy idea that there were no limits to it," said Boam. "I felt I could do anything, and so the script I wrote was very loony and far out there but everybody loved it. Dick Donner, Joe Dante, John Carpenter and even Steven Spielberg wanted to do it. So when Steven wanted to do it, Warners thought I was a God and any amount of money it would take to do the movie they would spend. Steve ultimately decided he only wanted to produce so Joe came along and really latched on to the idea."

Quaid's role was originally envisioned to be played by an older actor but then they decided to make the character younger. Dante recalled during filming scenes where Quaid and Short's characters interacted, "Dennis would be on the set in a booth, so the interaction was really happening. Dennis would hew to the script a little more than Marty. After you got a scene in the can, he'd beg for more takes, in the voice of Katharine Hepburn, which was hard to resist."

Dante says Spielberg would "protect you from the studio and sometimes from the other producers. It was a very filmmaker-friendly atmosphere over there [at Amblin]. You got all the best equipment and all the best people and all the toys you wanted to play with. Plus you had somebody on your side who was also a filmmaker and they knew exactly what you were talking about when you had a problem or you had a question."

"It's a dumb, stupid comedy, which is exactly what people need in the summertime," said Quaid. "It's very idiotic and I love it. We encounter every dumb, stupid cliché in the book. Leave your brain at home and you'll have a good time."

Meg Ryan met Quaid on set and they later married.

Awards
1988 Academy Award for Best Visual Effects, Won (Bill George, Dennis Muren, Harley Jessup and Kenneth F. Smith)
1988 Academy of Science Fiction, Fantasy & Horror Films: Best Director, Best Science Fiction Film, Best Special Effects, nominated

Reception

Box office
The film grossed $25.9 million in the United States and Canada, adding $28 million internationally, for a worldwide total of $42 million against a budget of $27 million.

Critical response
The film had a positive reception from critics.  

Roger Ebert of the Chicago Sun-Times gave the film 3 stars out of 4, stating "Here is an absurd, unwieldy, overplotted movie that nevertheless is entertaining - and some of the fun comes from the way the plot keeps laying it on". Proser later said, "I never actually have been able to sit through it all at once. They don't pay me to watch this crap. Like H. L. Hughgly, I wear a mask to cash the check." Joe Dante later said the film "was a hit on video. It was one of the first big videos, and it was discovered on video, basically. Although audiences liked it in theaters—when I went, they were in stitches—the ad campaign was so terrible for that movie. It was just a giant thumb with a little tiny pod on it. You couldn't tell that it was a comedy—you couldn't tell anything—and it had a terrible title, because we could never figure out a better one. And the studio botched the selling of it. I mean, they liked the movie, and they tried to reissue it, even, with a different campaign, and it still bombed."

"It's been looked back on as if it was some great success whereas, in fact, it was pretty much a disappointment in its day," he said. Dante later called the film "probably the movie that I had made up to then that was the closest to my intention. As a result, I was very happy with it. When I look at it today I still think it's a tremendous amount of fun."

See also
List of films featuring miniature people

References

External links

 
 

1987 films
1980s science fiction comedy films
American science fiction comedy films
1980s English-language films
Films directed by Joe Dante
Films that won the Best Visual Effects Academy Award
Films scored by Jerry Goldsmith
Amblin Entertainment films
Warner Bros. films
Films set in San Francisco
Films set in the San Francisco Bay Area
Films about size change
Films with screenplays by Jeffrey Boam
Human body in popular culture
1987 comedy films
1980s American films